Ayman Halawani, now known as Richard Halawani, is an American entrepreneur, film producer and was head of production at Rotana's film division. He produced the first Saudi movie Keif al-Hal, which included the first Saudi female actress to be on the big screen. He later co-founded a company called The Clinics (the-clinics.com) and a company in consumer services.

Campaign for change
Ayman says that not only are there no public cinemas in the kingdom, but there is only a small film-making industry, concentrating on short films and documentaries. Keif al-Hal is set in Saudi Arabia but it was actually made in Dubai which has the film infrastructure which the Saudis lack. Partly it is a simple matter of studio space but he says that even more importantly there is no body of skilled technicians to call on. He says that Rotana wants to change all that and this film is only the start of a campaign to do so.

Ayman says there need be no intrinsic religious or cultural objection to films in Saudi Arabia, although he acknowledges that care needs to be taken in choosing themes.

Filmography
The following is a list of films of Halawani as executive producer or producer.

 Lakhmet ras (2006)
 Keif al-Hal (2006)
 Al-Ghawas (2006)
 Al-Raksa al akhira (2006)
 Ouija (2006)
 Haha we tofaha (2006)
 Dars khososy (2005) 
 Dam el ghazal (2005) 
 Sayed el atifi (2005) 
 Harim Karim (2005)

External links
 

Living people
Year of birth missing (living people)